Holden is a lake in the municipality of Lierne in Trøndelag county, Norway. The  lake lies north of the lakes Lenglingen and Gusvatnet.

See also
List of lakes in Norway

References

Lierne
Lakes of Trøndelag